Kleinsasser is a surname. Notable people with the surname include:

Jim Kleinsasser (born 1977), American football player
Leland Kleinsasser (born 1934), American politician
 Lois Kleinsasser, American writer